Terai frog may refer to:

 Terai cricket frog, a frog associated with open grasslands
 Terai tree frog, a whipping frog

Animal common name disambiguation pages